Claus Thomsen (born 22 January 1959) is a Danish diver. He competed in the men's 10 metre platform event at the 1980 Summer Olympics.

References

1959 births
Living people
Danish male divers
Olympic divers of Denmark
Divers at the 1980 Summer Olympics
Sportspeople from Frederiksberg